Coralie is a feminine given name. It may also refer to:

 Louis Joseph Coralie (1912–1967), Mauritian politician
 Coralie, Queensland, a locality in the Shire of Croydon, Australia
 Coralie, the French-built second stage of the Europa rocket
 CORALIE, a spectrograph used by the Swiss 1.2-metre Leonhard Euler Telescope

See also
 Coralia